In behavioral finance, the ostrich effect is the attempt made by investors to avoid negative financial information. The name comes from the common (but false) legend that ostriches bury their heads in the sand to avoid danger.

For example, in the event of a market downturn, people may choose to avoid monitoring their investments or seeking out further financial news.

Research
 explain differences in returns in the fixed income market by using a psychological explanation, which they name the "ostrich effect," attributing this anomalous behavior to an aversion to receiving information on potential interim losses. They also provide evidence that the entrance to a leading financial portal in Israel is positively related to the equity market. Later, research by  determined that people in Scandinavia looked up the value of their investments 50% to 80% less often during bad markets.

 also found that investors prefer financial investments where the risk is unreported over those with a similar risk-return profile and frequently reported risks, saying that investors are willing to pay a premium for "the bliss of ignorance".

Criticism
A study by  showed no perceivable attempt by investors to ignore or avoid negative information, but instead found that "investors increase their portfolio monitoring following both positive and daily negative market returns, behaving more like hyper-vigilant meerkats than head-in-the-sand ostriches". They dubbed this phenomenon "meerkat effect".

See also
 Confirmation bias
 Denial
 Elephant in the room
 Myopic loss aversion
 Schrödinger's cat
 Selective exposure

References

Overview

Papers

External links

Adages
Behavioral finance
Cognitive biases
Metaphors referring to birds